Krawcheck is a surname. Notable people with the surname include:

Leonard Krawcheck (born 1941), American politician and lawyer
Sallie Krawcheck (born 1964), American businesswoman

Americanized surnames